Julian Grundt (born 21 June 1988) is a German former footballer who played as a midfielder for Werder Bremen II.

External links
 
 
 

1988 births
Living people
People from Heide
German footballers
Footballers from Schleswig-Holstein
Association football midfielders
3. Liga players
SV Werder Bremen II players